João Afonso de Albuquerque, O.F.M. was a Roman Catholic prelate who served as the first Bishop of Goa (1537–1553).

Biography
João de Albuquerque was ordained a priest in the Order of Friars Minor. 
On 11 Apr 1537, he was appointed during the papacy of Pope Paul III as Bishop of Goa.
On 13 Jan 1538, he was consecrated bishop in Lisbon by Diego de Ortiz de Vilhegas, Bishop of São Tomé e Príncipe, with Martinho de Portugal, Archbishop of Funchal, and Fernando de Menezes Coutinho e Vasconcellos, Bishop of Lamego, serving as co-consecrators.
He served as Bishop of Goa until his death on 28 Feb 1553.

References

External links
 
  

16th-century Roman Catholic bishops in India
Bishops appointed by Pope Paul III
Franciscan bishops
1553 deaths